Pudahuel (Mapudungun "place of pools/water" or "place where seagulls gather") is a commune of Chile located in Santiago Province, Santiago Metropolitan Region. Santiago's international airport Comodoro Arturo Merino Benítez is located there.

Demographics
The population grew by 18% (34,713 persons) between the 2002 and 2017 census.

Stats
Area: 197.4 km²
Population: 256,607 (2021 projection)
Average annual household income: US$19,766 (PPP, 2006)
Population below poverty line: 7.1% (2006)
Regional quality of life index: 71.61, mid-low, 39 out of 52 (2005)
Human Development Index: 0.735, 59 out of 341 (2003)

Administration
As a commune, Pudahuel is a third-level administrative division of Chile administered by a municipal council, headed by an alcalde (Mayor) who is directly elected every four years.

The 2021–2024 mayor is Ítalo Bravo Lizana (Equality Party). The communal council has the following members:

 Cinthya Muñoz Escanilla (PI)
 Sandy Muñoz Poblete (PI)
 Javiera Soto Fuentes (Ind./PH)
 Esteban Sepúlveda Reyes (PCCh)
 Carolina Seguel Hidalgo (PCCh)
 José Escobar Rodríguez (RD)
 Aldea Magaña Leiva (PS)
 Cristian Véliz Solís (Ind./PPD)
 Patricio Cisternas Monreal (PDC)
 Gisela Vila Ruz (UDI)

Within the electoral divisions of Chile, Pudahuel is part of electoral district No. 8 together with the commune of Colina, Lampa, Pudahuel, Maipú, Til Til, Cerrillos and Estación Central. On the other hand, the commune belongs to the VII Senatorial District that represents the entire Metropolitan Region of Santiago.

See also
Laguna Carén

References

External links
  Municipality of Pudahuel

Populated places in Santiago Province, Chile
Geography of Santiago, Chile
Communes of Chile
Populated places established in 1897
1897 establishments in Chile